Niklas Sundblad (born January 3, 1973) is a Swedish professional ice hockey coach and a former Swedish professional ice hockey player.

Playing career
Sundblad started his career in the youth teams at AIK close to his native Stockholm. He made his debut in the Swedish top-flight SHL during the 1990–91 season. He was a first round draft pick of the Calgary Flames, 19th overall, in the 1991 NHL Entry Draft.

He headed to North America before the 1993–94 season and spent two years with the Saint John Flames of the American Hockey League, then an affiliate of the Flames. He played two National Hockey League games for the Flames in the 1995–96 season, while continuing to get playing time in the AHL. He then opted to return to Europe.

Sundblad spent two years with HC TPS in Finland's top-tier competition Liiga, which included capturing the European Hockey League title in 1997 and a trip to the Liiga finals the same year, followed by two years in the Swedish Hockey League (SHL) with the Malmö Redhawks. In 2000, he signed with Düsseldorfer EG of Germany, before joining local rivals Kölner Haie, where he played from 2001 to 2003, winning the 2002 German championship with the Haie squad.

Sundblad returned to the Malmö Redhawks for a second stint in 2003–04. He played for Füchse Duisburg in Germany from 2004 to 2006 and spent time in Italy and Japan in his later playing days.

In 2006–07, Sundblad played for HC Alleghe of the Italian Serie A. On October 7, 2008, he left Alleghe and moved back to Sweden. After four appearances for AIK in the 2008-09 campaign, Sundblad called it a career and turned to coaching.

International career
Sundblad has represented his native Sweden several times in international competition. He won silver medals in both 1992 and 1993 at the World Junior Hockey Championships, as well as another silver medal at the 1997 Ice Hockey World Championships.

Coaching career
On October 22, 2008, Sundblad was named head coach of Herner EV, a minor league team in Germany. On December 3, 2009, he accepted a position as assistant coach with the Kölner Haie organization of the German elite league DEL. He served as head coach on an interim basis, when the club sacked Bill Stewart in November 2010, before returning to his role as assistant.

Sundblad left Köln after the 2012–13 season, taking up an offer from fellow DEL team ERC Ingolstadt where he became head coach. After finishing the 2013-14 regular season in 9th place, Sundblad directed his team to one of the most surprising playoff runs in DEL history, making it to the finals where they defeated Köln to give ERC its first ever German championship. Following the championship, Sundblad did not come to terms on a new contract with ERC and parted ways with the club.

In October 2014, Sundblad was named head coach of Kölner Haie to replace Uwe Krupp who he served under as an assistant coach during his earlier stint with the Haie organization. Köln were in 10th place in the DEL standings, when Sundblad was sacked on January 20, 2016.

On January 5, 2017, he took over the head coaching position at Örebro HK of the Swedish Hockey League (SHL). He was fired from the role on December 4, 2018.

Personal
Sundblad is the father of two girls, Jessica and Madeleine.

Career statistics

Regular season and playoffs

International

References

External links

1973 births
AIK IF players
Calgary Flames draft picks
Calgary Flames players
Düsseldorfer EG players
Füchse Duisburg players
HC Alleghe players
HC TPS players
Kölner Haie players
Living people
Malmö Redhawks players
National Hockey League first-round draft picks
Nippon Paper Cranes players
Saint John Flames players
Ice hockey people from Stockholm
Swedish ice hockey coaches
Swedish ice hockey right wingers